The men's tournament of water polo at the 2013 Summer Universiade was held from July 5 to 17 in Kazan, Russia.

Preliminary round

Group A

Group B

Consolation round

9th–12th place

Classification rounds

5th–8th place

7th-place game

5th-place game

Final round

Quarterfinals

Semifinals

Bronze-medal match

Gold-medal match

Final standings

References

Men